The 2022 Savannah Challenger was a professional tennis tournament played on clay courts. It was the twelfth edition of the tournament which was part of the 2022 ATP Challenger Tour. It took place in Savannah, Georgia, United States between 25 April and 1 May 2022.

Singles main-draw entrants

Seeds

1 Rankings are as of April 18, 2022.

Other entrants
The following players received wildcards into the singles main draw:
  Oliver Crawford
  Noah Rubin
  Learner Tien

The following player received entry into the singles main draw as an alternate:
  Mohamed Safwat

The following players received entry from the qualifying draw:
  Ezekiel Clark
  Arthur Fils
  Strong Kirchheimer
  Aidan Mayo
  Govind Nanda
  José Pereira

Champions

Singles

 Jack Sock def.  Christian Harrison 6–4, 6–1.

Doubles

 Ruben Gonzales /  Treat Huey def.  Wu Tung-lin /  Zhang Zhizhen 7–6(7–3), 6–4.

References

2022 ATP Challenger Tour
2022
2022 in American tennis
April 2022 sports events in the United States
May 2022 sports events in the United States
2022 in sports in Georgia (U.S. state)